Vatellus is a genus of beetles in the family Dytiscidae, containing the following species:

 Vatellus amae K.B.Miller, 2005
 Vatellus annae K.B.Miller, 2005
 Vatellus bifenestratus (Zimmermann, 1921)
 Vatellus drymetes K.B.Miller, 2005
 Vatellus grandis Buquet, 1840
 Vatellus haagi Wehncke, 1876
 Vatellus lateralis (Sharp, 1882)
 Vatellus maculosus K.B.Miller, 2005
 Vatellus mexicanus (Sharp, 1882)
 Vatellus perforatus (Guignot, 1955)
 Vatellus pilacaudus K.B.Miller, 2005
 Vatellus sahlbergi (Sharp, 1882)
 Vatellus tarsatus (Laporte, 1835)
 Vatellus ventralis (Sharp, 1882)
 Vatellus wheeleri K.B.Miller, 2005

References

Dytiscidae genera